SS Reverdy Johnson was a Liberty ship built in the United States during World War II. She was named after Reverdy Johnson, a statesman and jurist from Maryland. From 1845 to 1849, Johnson represented Maryland in the United States Senate as a Whig. From March 1849 until July 1850, Johnson was Attorney General of the United States under President Zachary Taylor. He represented the slave-owning defendant in the controversial 1857 case Dred Scott v. Sandford. In 1865, he defended Mary Surratt before a military tribunal. From 14 September 1868 until 13 May 1869, he served as the ambassador to the United Kingdom.

Construction
Reverdy Johnson was laid down on 15 May 1942, under a Maritime Commission (MARCOM) contract, MCE hull 51, by the Bethlehem-Fairfield Shipyard, Baltimore, Maryland; she was sponsored by Miss Eliz R. Simpson, a direct descendant Reverdy Johnson, and was launched on 10 July 1942.

History
She was allocated to American Export Lines, Inc., on 25 July 1942. On 5 May 1948, she was laid up in the National Defense Reserve Fleet, Wilmington, North Carolina. She was sold for scrapping on 19 January 1967, to Union Minerals & Alloys Corp., for $45,567.89. She was withdrawn from the fleet on 17 February 1967.

References

Bibliography

 
 
 
 

 

Liberty ships
Ships built in Baltimore
1942 ships
Wilmington Reserve Fleet